{{DISPLAYTITLE:C19H28O2}}
The molecular formula C19H28O2 (molar mass: 288.42 g/mol, exact Mass: 288.20893) may refer to:

 Androstanedione
 1-Androsterone
 Benorterone, an antiandrogen
 Dehydroandrosterone
 Dehydroepiandrosterone, a neurosteroid
 4-Dehydroepiandrosterone
 Epitestosterone
 Etiocholanedione
 Methylestrenolone
 11β-Methyl-19-nortestosterone
 Prasterone
 Testosterone
 1-Testosterone, an anabolic steroid
 Trestolone